Carathis palpalis is a moth of the family Erebidae first described by Francis Walker in 1855. It is found on Jamaica.

References

Phaegopterina
Moths described in 1855